The Four Nations Initiative (4NI) is a cooperation project started in 2005 as an initiative by Chile, South Africa, Sweden and Thailand. The initiative was created to contribute to the efforts to reform governance and management systems and structures of the UN Secretariat, departing from the perspective of the UN Member States.

The Four Nations Initiative, active from early 2006 until October 2007, consists of a steering committee with representatives from all four countries, and a secretariat based in Stockholm.

UN Secretariat reform is an important topic and was high on the agenda during the tenure of Secretary-General Kofi Annan. There have been many reform efforts, notably the Secretary-General's reports Investing in the United Nations and Mandating and delivering, both from March 2006, and the Comprehensive review of governance and oversight in the UN, June 2006.

The Four Nations Initiative differs from the above-mentioned reform initiatives by being driven by Member States themselves. It is also characterised by its focus on a consultations process trying to create as large as possible scope for consensus before actually submitting reform proposals. The Initiative plans to submit final proposals by September 2007 but a preliminary report is already available on the 4NI website (Towards a Compact - report of preliminary proposals by the Steering Committee of the Four Nations Initiative).

References
Brief Introduction to the Four Nations Initiative, 2006, Information paper by the 4NI Secretariat
Comprehensive review of governance and oversight in the UN, 2006, Report of the Steering Committee on governance and oversight, UN Document A/60/883.Add.1-6
Investing in the United Nations, 2006, Report of the Secretary-General, UN Document A/60/692
Mandating and delivering, 2006, Report of the Secretary-General, UN Document A/60/733
Towards a Compact, 2007, Report of preliminary proposals by the Steering Committee of the Four Nations Initiative
''32 Specific Proposals to Make the UN Function Better - An interview with Ambassador Bengt Säve-Söderbergh of Sweden on the recently issued report from the Four Nations

External links
UN reform website
 Center for UN Reform - Independent policy research organization offering documentation and in-depth analysis on ongoing reform processes

United Nations Secretariat
United Nations reform